Karim Souchu (born March 30, 1979 in Senlis, France) is a French basketball player currently playing for SLUC Nancy of the LNB Pro A.

References

French men's basketball players
1979 births
Living people
Furman Paladins men's basketball players
Cholet Basket players
Limoges CSP players
JDA Dijon Basket players
Chorale Roanne Basket players
ASVEL Basket players
STB Le Havre players
AEL Limassol B.C. players
Liège Basket players
Small forwards
Shooting guards